John Stovall House, also known as the Stovall House Country Inn, is a historic residence in Sautee in White County, Georgia that has operated as an inn since 1983. It was built in 1837 by Moses Harshaw. It was added to the National Register of Historic Places on June 14, 1991. It is located on Stovall Road south of the junction with Georgia State Route 255.

See also
National Register of Historic Places listings in White County, Georgia

References

External links
Official website

Houses on the National Register of Historic Places in Georgia (U.S. state)
Houses in White County, Georgia
Hotel buildings on the National Register of Historic Places in Georgia (U.S. state)
Houses completed in 1837
Hotels established in 1983
1983 establishments in Georgia (U.S. state)
National Register of Historic Places in White County, Georgia